Quedara basiflava, the yellow-base flitter  or golden flitter, is a butterfly belonging to the family Hesperiidae and is endemic to India's Western Ghats.

Description

Food plants
The larvae feed on Calamus hookerianus, Calamus pseudofeanus, Calamus rotang and Calamus thwaitesii.

References

Hesperiinae
Butterflies described in 1888
Butterflies of Asia
Taxa named by Lionel de Nicéville